The State Railway of Thailand ASR class is a diesel multiple unit operated by the State Railway of Thailand. Built by British Rail Engineering Limited at Derby Litchurch Lane Works in England, it is based on the British Rail Class 158. Twenty carriages were built in 1990/91. All were painted in the same Regional Railways livery as the Class 158s.

In Thailand, they are colloquially known as "Sprinter". The first Sprinter services in Thailand was the train no.907/908 Bangkok-Chiang Mai-Bangkok on June 11, 1991.

References

External links

BREL products
Rolling stock of Thailand